The 2018 Asia Rugby Women’s Championship Div 1 was hosted by Singapore at the Queenstown Stadium, from 2 June to 8 June. India made their international debut in the opening match against Singapore. Although active in rugby sevens, India did not have a fifteens team; fifteens was only initiated at the end of 2016. Singapore defeated the Philippines to win the Division 1 title.

Standings

Results

Round 1

Round 2

Round 3 

Source:

References 

2018 in Asian rugby union
2018 in women's rugby union